Lewin José Díaz (born November 19, 1996) is a Dominican professional baseball first baseman in the Baltimore Orioles organization. He has previously played in Major League Baseball (MLB) for the Miami Marlins.

Career

Minnesota Twins
Díaz signed with the Minnesota Twins as an international free agent on November 21, 2013. He played for the DSL Twins in 2014, hitting .257/.385/.451/.836 with 5 home runs and 27 RBI. He split the 2015 season between the GCL Twins and the Elizabethton Twins, hitting a combined .233/.322/.371/.693 with 4 home runs and 20 RBI. He returned to Elizabethton in 2016, and hit .310/.353/.575/.928 with 9 home runs and 37 RBI. He played for the Cedar Rapids Kernels in 2017, hitting .292/.329/.444/.773 with 12 home runs and 68 RBI. He spent the 2018 season with the Fort Myers Miracle, hitting .224/.255/.344/.599 with 6 home runs and 38 RBI. He opened the 2019 season back with Fort Myers, before being promoted to the Pensacola Blue Wahoos on June 19. Between the two teams, he hit a combined .294/.336/.553/.889 with 19 home runs and 62 RBI.

Miami Marlins
On July 27, 2019, the Twins traded Díaz to the Miami Marlins in exchange for Sergio Romo, Chris Vallimont, and a player to be named later. He was assigned to the Jacksonville Jumbo Shrimp following the trade. Over 31 games with Jacksonville, he batted .200 with eight home runs.

Díaz was added to the Marlins 40–man roster following the 2019 season.

On August 15, 2020, Díaz was promoted to the major leagues. He made his debut that day against the Atlanta Braves and got his first major league hit in his only at-bat against Mark Melancon. On November 15, 2022, Díaz was designated for assignment.

Baltimore Orioles
On November 22, 2022, Díaz was claimed off waivers by the Pittsburgh Pirates. On December 2, 2022, Diaz was claimed off waivers by the Baltimore Orioles. He was designated for assignment on December 21, 2022. On December 22, 2022, Díaz was traded to the Atlanta Braves in exchange for cash considerations. Six days later, the Braves designated Díaz for assignment. 

On January 5, 2023, Díaz was claimed off waivers by the Baltimore Orioles again. He was again designated for assignment by the Orioles on January 11 after the team traded for Darwinzon Hernández. On January 17, Díaz cleared waivers and was assigned outright to the Triple-A Norfolk Tides.

Personal life
Díaz is married to Silenia Calicchio.

References

External links

1996 births
Living people
Major League Baseball players from the Dominican Republic
Major League Baseball first basemen
Miami Marlins players
Dominican Summer League Twins players
Gulf Coast Twins players
Elizabethton Twins players
Cedar Rapids Kernels players
Fort Myers Miracle players
Pensacola Blue Wahoos players
Jacksonville Jumbo Shrimp players
Estrellas Orientales players
People from Santiago de los Caballeros